Rico Linhas Aéreas Flight 4823 was a short haul domestic Brazilian flight from Cruzeiro do Sul, and Tarauacá to Rio Branco. On 30 August 2002, the Embraer EMB 120 Brasilia, registration PT-WRQ, flying the route crashed in heavy rain. Of the 31 aboard, 23 were killed, including all three crew members, and 20 of the 28 passengers.

As the Brasilia was on approach to Rio Branco, ground controllers granted the flight crew permission to land. The aircraft then entered a rainstorm and shortly after impacted with the ground tail first,  from the airport. The fuselage broke into three sections and a fire broke out, damaging the airplane beyond repair.

References

External links 
Final Report - CENIPA

Aviation accidents and incidents in 2002
Aviation accidents and incidents in Brazil
Accidents and incidents involving the Embraer EMB 120 Brasilia
August 2002 events in South America